Croatian singer Jelena Rozga has released 3 studio albums, two compilations, 42 singles and 30 music videos.

Studio albums

Compilation albums

Singles

Music videos

References 

Discographies of Croatian artists